Lanne may refer to:

People
 Colleen Lanne (born 1979), American swimmer
 William Lanne (1835-1869), Tasmanian aboriginal

Places
 Lanne, Hautes-Pyrénées, France
 Lanne-Soubiran, Gers, France
 Lanne-en-Barétous, Pyrénées-Atlantiques, France
 Port-de-Lanne, Landes, France

See also
 Lannes (disambiguation)